Lumi may refer to:

Computing 
 Lumi (software), chemical analysis software
 Lumi masking, a technique used by video compression software
 LUMI, a supercomputer located in Finland

Music 
 Lumi (album), a 1987 album by Edward Vesala
 Lumi (band), a Lebanese krautrock band
 Lumi, a fictional singer for the virtual band Genki Rockets
 LUMi, a synthetic voice for the Vocaloid software

People

Given name
 Lumi Cavazos (born 1968), Mexican actress

Surname
 Harri Lumi (born 1933), Estonian former Communist politician
 Ott Lumi (born 1978), Estonian politician
 Risto Lumi (born 1971), Estonian military Lieutenant Colonel

Places 
 Aitape-Lumi District, Papua New Guinea
 Al-Lumi, a village in central Yemen
 Lumi, Albania, a village in NE Albania
 Lumi, Yemen, a village in central Yemen
 Lumi River (East Africa), a river in Tanzania and Kenya
 Lumi River (Zambia), a river in Zambia

Other uses 
 Lumi (company), a packaging supply chain company and inventor of Inkodye
 Lumi (currency), the current legal tender of Accompong state and for Eco-6, the 6th Economic Region of the Africa Union
 Salmo lumi, a type of fish

See also 
 Lumia (disambiguation)
 Lumi River (disambiguation)

Estonian-language surnames